Francisco de Meneses was the 3rd Governor of Portuguese Ceylon. de Meneses was appointed in 1613 under Philip II of Portugal, he was Governor until 1614. He was succeeded by Manuel Mascarenhas Homem.

References

Governors of Portuguese Ceylon
16th-century Portuguese people
17th-century Portuguese people